Asematunneli is an underground shopping center connecting the Helsinki Central railway station and City-Center in downtown Helsinki, Finland. The area also has a ticket sales area for the Rautatientori metro station and connections to the nearby Forum shopping mall as well as Stockmann and Sokos department stores. The shops and supermarkets in Asematunneli are licensed to stay open longer than normal as well as during the national holidays, making the shopping center an important location for last minute and emergency shopping for the people of the greater Helsinki area.  Kamppi Center and the bottom floor of Sähkötalo across Fredrikinkatu can also be accessed via tunnels by going through the Forum shopping mall first. The interconnecting areas provide for convenient movement across a wide area of central Helsinki, and allow pedestrians to escape the rain, snow, and cold weather that dominate much of the Finnish calendar.

Asematunneli was built by digging up Kaivokatu and pouring concrete canopies for the tunnels in 1966–1967.

Gallery

External links
 

Buildings and structures in Helsinki
Kluuvi